Martin Boykan (April 12, 1931 – March 6, 2021) was an American composer known for his chamber music as well as music for larger ensembles.

Biography

Boykan was born in New York City. He studied composition first with Walter Piston at Harvard, where he received a BA in 1951. He then went to Zürich to study with Paul Hindemith, with whom he continued his studies at Yale University, earning an MM in 1953. Subsequently, he went to Vienna on a Fulbright scholarship. He also studied composition with Aaron Copland at Tanglewood (1949, 1950), and piano with Eduard Steuermann. Upon his return to the United States in 1955 he founded the Brandeis Chamber Ensemble, whose other members included Robert Koff (Juilliard String Quartet), Nancy Cirillo (Wellesley), Eugene Lehner (Kolisch Quartet), and Madeline Foley (Marlboro Festival). This ensemble performed widely with a repertory divided equally between contemporary music and the tradition. At the same time Boykan appeared regularly as a pianist with soloists such as Joseph Silverstein and Jan DeGaetani. In 1964–65, he was the pianist with the Boston Symphony Orchestra under Erich Leinsdorf.

He has had residencies at Yaddo (1981 and 1992), the MacDowell Colony in Peterborough, New Hampshire (1982, 1989, 1992), and at the Virginia Center for the Creative Arts, Amherst, Virginia (1992, 2007, 2010).

Boykan taught at Brandeis University starting in 1957, and was appointed professor there in 1976. He has held the title Irving G. Fine Professor of Music. Boykan has been composer-in-residence at the Composer's Conference in Wellesley (1987) and a visiting professor at Columbia University (1988–89) and at New York University (1993 and 2000). Boykan was Senior Fulbright Lecturer at Bar-Ilan University, Israel (1994) and composer-in-residence at Warebrook Contemporary Music Festival, Irasburg, Vermont (1998). He has served on many panels, including the Rome Prize, the Fromm Commission, the New York Council for the Arts (CAPS) and the Virginia Center for the Creative Arts. Over the years he has taught many hundreds of students including Steven Mackey, Peter Lieberson, Ross Bauer, Paul Beaudoin, Craig Walsh, and Marjorie Merryman. 

Boykan's mature compositional style, beginning with the partly serial String Quartet No. 1 (1967), is marked by the influence of Anton Webern and the late works of Igor Stravinsky. After the First Quartet, he began consistently to use twelve-tone technique.

Boykan has written for a wide variety of instrumental combinations including four string quartets, a concerto for large ensemble, many trios, duos and solo works, song cycles for voice and piano as well as voice and other instruments, and choral music. His symphony for orchestra and baritone solo was premiered by the Utah Symphony in 1993 and in 2009 his Concerto for Violin was premiered by the Boston Modern Orchestra Project. His work is widely performed and has been presented by ensembles including the Boston Symphony Chamber Players, the New York New Music Ensemble, Speculum Musicae, the League-ISCM, Earplay, Musica Viva and Collage New Music.

He received the Jeunesse musicales award for his String Quartet No. 1 in 1967, and the League-ISCM award for Elegy in 1982. Other awards include a Rockefeller grant (1974), NEA award (1983), Guggenheim Fellowship (1984), two Fulbrights (1953–55), as well as a recording award and the Walter Hinrichsen Publication Award from the American Academy (1988) and National Institute of Arts and Letters (1986). In 1994 he was awarded a Senior Fulbright to Israel. He has received numerous commissions from chamber ensembles as well as commissions from the Koussevitsky Foundation in the Library of Congress (1985), and the Fromm Foundation (1976).

Personal life
Boykan was the son of New York dentist Joseph Boykan and his wife Matilda, and the brother of mathematical logician Marian Pour-El. He married the silverpoint artist Susan Schwalb in 1983. Boykan died at his home on March 6, 2021, aged 89.

Selected works and publications

 String Trio (1948)
 String Quartet (1949)
 Flute Sonata (1950)
 Duo for Violin and Piano (1951)
 Flute Quintet (1953)
 By the Waters of Babylon, prelude for organ (1964)
 Psalm 128 for a cappella chorus (1965)
 String Quartet No. 1 (1967), recorded by CRI
 Concerto for 13 players (1971), APNM
 String Quartet No. 2 (1974), recorded by CRI
 Trio for violin, cello and piano (1975), commissioned by the Fromm Foundation
 Elegy for soprano and six Instruments, on texts by Goethe, Leopari, Wngaretti, Emily Dickinson, and Li Ho (1982), recorded by CRI
 String Quartet No. 3 (1984)
 Shalom Rav''' for baritone, chorus and organ (1985)
 Piano Sonata No. 1 (1986)
 Epithalamion for baritone, violin and harp (1987), recorded by CRI
 Symphony for orchestra with baritone solo (1989), commissioned by the Koussevitzky Foundation
 Piano Sonata No. 2 (1990)
 Nocturne for Cello, Piano and Percussion (1991)
 Eclogue, for flute, horn, viola, cello and piano (1991)
 Echoes of Petrarch for flute, clarinet and piano (1992), recorded by CRI
 Sonata for cello and piano (1992)
 Voyages for soprano and piano, on texts by Hart Crane (1992)
 Sea Gardens, four songs for soprano and piano, on texts by Hart Crane, Whitman, and Shakespeare (1993)
 Impromptu for violin solo (1993)
 Three Psalms for soprano and piano (1993)
 Pastorale for piano (1993)
 Sonata for Violin and Piano (1994) C.F. Peters
 Ma'ariv Settings for chorus and organ (1995)
 String Quartet No. 4 (1995–96), recorded by CRI
 Three Shakespeare Songs for chorus (1996)
 City of Gold (1996), recorded by CRI
 Trio No. 2 for violin, cello and piano (1997) recorded for CRI
 Psalm 121 for Soprano and String Quartet (1997)
 Usurpations, five bagatelles for piano (1997)
 Sonata for solo violin (1998)
 Flume for clarinet and piano (1998)
 Romanza for flute and piano (1999)
 A Packet for Susan, five songs for mezzo-soprano and piano on texts by Keats, Donne, Landor and Lear (2000)
 Motet for mezzo-soprano and consort of viols (2001)
 Songlines for flute, clarinet, violin and ‘cello (2001)
 Concerto for violin and piano (2004)
 Second Chances (2005), song cycle on texts by Mary Oliver for mezzo-soprano and piano, premiere performances in New York (Jan. 2006) and Boston (Feb. 2006).
 Piano Trio No. 3, “Rites of Passage” (2006)
 Piano Sonata No. 3 (2007)
 Toward the Horizon, Novella, for piano solo (2008)
 Soliloquies of an Insomniac, four songs for soprano and piano (2008)
 Sonata No. 2 for violin and piano (2009)
 "As Once on a Deserted Street..." (2010) for quintet (piano, violin, clarinet, horn, cello)

Recordings

His String Quartets Nos. 1 and 2 are both recorded on CRI. A disc of vocal music (Elegy and Epithalamion) was released by CRI in 1998, along with the String Quartet No. 4. A second CD including the Piano Trio No. 2, Echoes of Petrarch (trio for flute, clarinet and piano), City of Gold (flute) and the Second Quartet was released in January 2000. A new CD of chamber works issued by CRI (assigned to New World Records now and can be ordered on line) includes a violin sonata, Flume for clarinet and piano, a song cycle (A Packet for Susan), and the First String Quartet. Sonata for Solo Violin(commissioned by Dan Stepner) is included on a CD by the violinist Curt Macomber (also CRI/New World).

In 2010 Albany Records released the CD Second Chances which includes String Quartet No. 3, Motet, Songlines and Second Chances featuring Pamela Dellal, mezzo-soprano and Donald Berman, Pianist. Scores are published by Mobart Music Press and C.F. Peters, New York.

In 2004 Scarecrow Press, Maryland, published a collection of essays entitled Silence and Slow-Time: Studies in Musical Narrative. His second book, The Power of the Moment: Essays on the Western Musical Canon, was published by Pendragon Press in 2011.

Three artist books produced in collaboration with his wife, the artist Susan Schwalb, were recently purchased by the Music Division of the Library of Congress: City of Gold (flute solo), Flume (clarinet), and Nocturne (viola da gamba).

References

Further reading
 Anderson, Paul E. 2000. "Echoes of Petrarch: Martin Boykan and Musical Narrative". Perspectives of New Music 38, no. 2 (Summer): 168–181.
 Cory, Eleanor. 1976. "Martin Boykan: String Quartet No. 1 (1967)". The Musical Quarterly 62:616–620.
 Harbison, John, and Eleanor Cory. 1973. "Martin Boykan: String Quartet (1967), Two Views". Perspectives of New Music 11, no. 2 (Spring–Summer): 204–248.
 Pollack, Howard. 1992. Harvard Composers: Walter Piston and His Students from Elliott Carter to Frederic Rzewski. Lanham, Maryland: Greenwood Press.
 Rakowski, David. 2000. "For Martin Boykan's Birthday Festschrift". Perspectives of New Music 38, no. 2 (Summer): 199–207.
 Roens, Steven. 2000. "Encomium". Perspectives of New Music 38, no. 2 (Summer): 208–212.

External links

 
 Profile at Boston Modern Orchestra Project
 Profile at DRAM
 Profile at Sigma Alpha Iota
 Project Muse – John Lowell Brackett's review of Boykan's Silence and Slow Time
 "Martin Boykan, 15, makes piano debut" by R.L., The New York Times'', P. 53, January 12, 1947

1931 births
2021 deaths
Harvard University alumni
Musicians from New York City
Twelve-tone and serial composers
American classical composers
American male classical composers
20th-century classical composers
21st-century classical composers
20th-century American composers
21st-century American composers
20th-century American male musicians
21st-century American male musicians
Members of the American Academy of Arts and Letters